George Richard Dobson (24 August 1949 – 10 September 2007) was an English footballer who played in the Football League for Brentford as a winger. He later dropped into non-League football and played for Guildford City and Slough Town. After retiring as a player, he became a coach.

Playing career

Brentford 
A winger, Dobson joined Brentford at a young age and came through the youth ranks and made his debut in a 1–0 Fourth Division win over Chesterfield at Griffin Park on 25 February 1967 at the age of just 17. He quickly established himself as a first team regular, making 37 appearances during the 1967–68 season and winning rave reviews for his ability to take on and beat opposition full backs. Dobson's appearance count reduced during the 1968–69 season, as a broken ankle hindered his progress. An injury to Dobson's other leg ensured he would not be the same player again and he departed the Bees at the end of the 1969–70 season. He made 93 appearances and scored 10 goals for the club.

Non-League football 
After his release from Brentford, Dobson had spells with non-League clubs Guildford City and Slough Town in the 1970s.

Coaching career 
Dobson later returned to Brentford to work in the club's Centre Of Excellence.

Personal life 
Dobson had two sons, Michael and Richard, who were both on the books at Brentford, with Michael making over 200 appearances for the first team between 2000 and 2006, many of them as captain. Richard played non-League football and went on to work in the Centre Of Excellence at Brentford and coached the club's women's team, before moving to Wycombe Wanderers in 2007 to work in the club's youth system, rising to become first team assistant manager in 2011. Dobson, a cancer sufferer, died on 10 September 2007.

Career statistics

References

1949 births
Footballers from Chiswick
English footballers
Brentford F.C. players
English Football League players
2007 deaths
Guildford City F.C. players
Slough Town F.C. players
Isthmian League players
Southern Football League players
Association football wingers
Brentford F.C. non-playing staff